Jackie Ray Slater (born May 27, 1954), nicknamed "Big Bad Jackie", is an American former professional football player who was an offensive tackle for 20 seasons in the National Football League (NFL). He played his entire career with the Rams franchise: 19 seasons in Los Angeles, from 1976–1994, and one in St. Louis in 1995. Slater holds the record amongst all offensive linemen who have played the most seasons with one franchise.

A graduate of Jackson State University, he was a teammate of Walter Payton. Drafted in the third round of the 1976 NFL Draft, Slater seldom played his first few years before starting in 1979. Known as the most consistent member of one of the most potent offensive lines in NFL history, Slater was selected to seven Pro Bowls and broke a record for most seasons with one team. His jersey number was retired and he was inducted to the Pro Football Hall of Fame in 2001.

Slater was most recently the offensive line coach at Azusa Pacific University in Azusa, California. His son, Matthew Slater, is a special teams player for the New England Patriots.

College
Slater was born in Jackson, Mississippi. He was the first member of his family to attend a desegregated school, Wingfield High School. He attended Jackson State University, where he played three years alongside Walter Payton, who personally recruited him. Slater was selected to the Southwestern Athletic Conference All-Star Game three times. After his senior season, he was invited to participate in the College All-Star Game.

NFL career
Used primarily as a backup and special teams player during his first three seasons, Slater became the starting right tackle in 1979. That year the Rams went to Super Bowl XIV, losing to the Pittsburgh Steelers. In 1980, he was part of an offensive line that surrendered just 29 sacks and helped the Rams' offense finish second in the NFL in total yards gained with 6,006.

In 1983, Rams' offensive line allowed a league-low 23 sacks while also blocking for running back Eric Dickerson's rookie rushing record of 1,808 yards. On September 25, Slater took exception to New York Jets defensive end Mark Gastineau, who showboated after beating Slater for a sack, leading to a bench-clearing brawl that saw both players get ejected.

In 1986, Slater was a key blocker for Dickerson as he ran for a playoff record 248 yards and two touchdowns against the Dallas Cowboys in an NFL divisional game.

Slater was considered the most consistent members of one of the best offensive lines in the NFL, which also included Pro Bowlers Kent Hill and Dennis Harrah, and was recognized for his "work ethic and leadership skills" when he was inducted to the Hall of Fame. He retired after the 1995 season when injuries reduced him to playing one game the entire year. He is the only player in league history to play for one single team/franchise in three different cities (Los Angeles 1976–1979, Anaheim 1980–1994, and St. Louis 1995). Due to his longevity, Slater was also teammates with multiple Hall of Famers from multiple Rams eras such as Merlin Olsen, Joe Namath, Eric Dickerson, Jerome Bettis, and Issac Bruce.

He was voted the National Football League Players Association's NFC Offensive Lineman of the Year four times—1983, 1986, 1987, and 1989—and was the Athletes in Action/Bart Starr Award winner after the 1995 season. Slater played in 259 games from 1976 to 1995, a then-record for offensive lineman. He was the second player to play 20 seasons for one team following Cleveland Browns tackle/kicker Lou Groza. This record was later matched by Washington Redskins cornerback Darrell Green, Detroit Lions kicker Jason Hanson, and New England Patriots quarterback Tom Brady. He played for 24 quarterbacks and 37 running backs. Former teammate Jim Everett stated "Jackie Slater is proof they were playing football in the prehistoric days".  He was Dickerson's Hall of Fame presenter in 1999. In 2001, Slater was enshrined in the Pro Football Hall of Fame.

Coaching career
After his football career ended, Slater worked for an ABC affiliate in Los Angeles. He participated as a guest coach during St. Louis Rams training camps in the early 2000s. On February 16, 2006, Oakland Raiders head coach Art Shell hired him to become offensive line coach alongside Irv Eatman. Slater was hired to mentor Robert Gallery, who was moving to left tackle. Gallery struggled that season and Slater was released by the Raiders for the 2007 season and replaced by Tom Cable. He was most recently the offensive line coach at Azusa Pacific University in Azusa, California.

Personal life
Slater's son, Matthew Slater, played college football at UCLA and was drafted by the New England Patriots in the fifth round of the 2008 NFL Draft. He is a gunner and special teams captain for the Patriots. The Slaters have 17 Pro Bowl nods between them, making the Slater family the third most-nominated family in history behind the Matthews family (25) and the Manning family (20). Slater and his family live in Orange County, California.

Slater is active with the NFL Play 60 program, which sends NFL players to schools to discuss spending 60 minutes a day to participate in sports activities.

See also

 List of St. Louis Rams players
 History of the Los Angeles Rams
 List of National Football League records (individual)
 List of second generation National Football League players

References

External links
 

1954 births
Living people
American Conference Pro Bowl players
American football offensive tackles
Azusa Pacific Cougars football coaches
Jackson State Tigers football players
Los Angeles Rams players
Oakland Raiders coaches
National Conference Pro Bowl players
National Football League players with retired numbers
Players of American football from Jackson, Mississippi
Pro Football Hall of Fame inductees
Sportspeople from Jackson, Mississippi
St. Louis Rams players
Ed Block Courage Award recipients